Julie Roberts is the debut album from American country music artist Julie Roberts. Released in 2004 on Mercury Nashville Records, the album produced three singles for Roberts on the Billboard country charts. "Break Down Here" was the only one of these singles to reach Top 40, peaking at 18. The second and third singles, "The Chance" and "Wake Up Older", reached No. 47 and No. 46, respectively. The album has been certified gold by the Recording Industry Association of America (RIAA).

"Break Down Here" was previously recorded by Trace Adkins as "I'd Sure Hate to Break Down Here" on his 2003 album Comin' On Strong, while "No Way Out" was previously released as a single by Suzy Bogguss from her 1996 album Give Me Some Wheels. Additionally, Jann Browne previously released "You Ain't Down Home" as a single from her 1990 album Tell Me Why.

Track listing

Personnel
As listed in liner notes.
Eric Darken – percussion on "Just 'Cause We Can" and "No Way Out"
Shannon Forrest – drums on all tracks
Vince Gill – background vocals on "Unlove Me" and "The Chance"
Wes Hightower – background vocals on all tracks except "Break Down Here" and "The Chance"
David Hungate – bass guitar on all tracks
Tim Lauer – pump organ on "Break Down Here", accordion on "Pot of Gold"; keyboards on "If You Had Called Yesterday" and "I Can't Get Over You"
Delbert McClinton – background vocals on "No Way Out"
Pat McLaughlin – background vocals on "Break Down Here"
Gordon Mote – keyboards on all tracks
Al Perkins – steel guitar on "Unlove Me" and "I Can't Get Over You"
Julie Roberts – lead vocals on all tracks
Brent Rowan – electric guitar on all tracks; background vocals and hand claps on "No Way Out"
Bryan Sutton – acoustic guitar on all tracks; mandocello on "Break Down Here" and "Pot of Gold"

Chart performance

Weekly charts

Year-end charts

Singles

Certifications

References

2004 debut albums
Mercury Nashville albums
Julie Roberts albums
Albums produced by Brent Rowan